Secret Love (lit. Secret) is a 2013 South Korean television series starring Hwang Jung-eum, Ji Sung, Bae Soo-bin and Lee Da-hee. It aired on KBS2 from September 25 to November 14, 2013, on Wednesdays and Thursdays at 21:55 for 16 episodes.

Plot
A rich "bad boy" falls in love with an innocent but tenacious woman who went to prison for her boyfriend's 'hit and run' murder. As the story unfolds, secrets begin to unravel.

Cast

Main
Hwang Jung-eum as Kang Yoo-jung

She sacrifices her future by going to prison in place of her then-boyfriend, Do-hoon after he kills a woman in a hit-and-run accident. Refusing to give in to despair, she emerges from prison becoming a stronger woman who's determined to make a fresh start and live differently.

Ji Sung as Jo Min-hyuk
A second-generation chaebol who has everything but a good personality, he burns with revenge after the death of his girlfriend, who was killed in the hit and run accident. He later realises there is a whole different story to the original culprit, and falls in love with the seemingly worst person to do so (Yoo-jung) as he realised her kindness in life.

Bae Soo-bin as Ahn Do-hoon

Once a brilliant and righteous prosecutor, after his girlfriend went into prison instead of him, he transforms into an ambitious man, hungry for power.

Lee Da-hee as Shin Se-yeon
She is engaged to Min-hyuk, and she has been buried in insecurity because of Min-hyuk's love to Ji-hee (his deceased girlfriend), then to Yoo-jung as the story progresses.

Supporting
Lee Deok-hwa as Chairman Jo Han-il, father of Jo Min-hyuk and Jo Min-joo
Jo Mi-ryung as Madam Hong In-joo, Chairman Jo Han-il's wife, Min-joo's mother and Min-hyuk's step-mother 
Song Min-kyung as Jo Min-joo, Jo Min-hyuk's sister 
Yang Jin-sung as Seo Ji-hee, Jo Min-hyuk's girlfriend, killed in accident 
Lee Seung-joon as Choi Kwang-min, Chairman Jo Han-il's secretary and Kwang-soo's older brother 
Choi Woong as Choi Kwang-soo, Jo Min-hyuk's secretary and Kwang-min's younger brother
Kang Nam-gil as Kang Woo-chul, Kang Yoo-jung's father
Ahn Ji-hyun as Yang Hae-ri, Kang Yoo-jung's friend 
Jung Soo-young as Dan-bal / Lee Ja-yeong
Hwang Seok-jeong as Sandra Hwang
Moon Ji-in as Lee Hye-jin, Kang Yoo-jung's prison friend 
Yang Hee-kyung as Park Kye-ok, Ahn Do-hoon's mother
Kang Shin-il as Ahn In-hwan, Ahn Do-hoon's father
Kim Hyun-kyun as Park Hyun-seok
Han Ki-joong as Yang Ik-tae
?? as Assemblyman Shin Sang-ho
Kim Hee-ryeong as Madam Yeon Mi-yeon
Yoon Gil as Kim Jae-ha
Kim Seong-hun as restaurant manager
Jung Yoogeon as San/Jeong Hwan
 Lee Dong-ha

Ratings
In the table below, the blue numbers represent the lowest ratings and the red numbers represent the highest ratings.
 NR denotes that the drama did not rank in the top 20 daily programs on that date.

Awards and nominations

Original soundtrack

Track listings

International broadcast
 Japan - KNTV - February 14, 2014
 Philippines - GMA Network - July 14, 2014 to September 11, 2014  and with replays on GMA News TV from December 10, 2016 to March 26, 2017
 Thailand - True Asian Series - May 17, 2014 and with replays on Channel 3 from August 7, 2020 to August 26, 2020
 Turkey - Kanal 7 - August 27, 2018<ref>

Version
Secret Love later being adapted into a Malay-language drama, dubbed Patahnya Sebelah Sayap (broke leftwings) starred Ummi Nazeera,Aeril Zafril and Izzue Islam on March 2018 in TV3. However only a few scene is similar , and most of the scenes were changed to follow Malaysian custom and life style, which differs greatly to the Korean Society.

Secret Love was also adapted into a Turkish drama, dubbed Meryem – Tales Of Innocence, starred Furkan Andic, Ayça Aysin Turan and Cemal Toktas. It was produced by TMC and aired on Kanal D from August 2, 2017 to February 28, 2018. And yet the Turkish remake witnessed some changes that are different from the original Korean plot.

References

External links
  
 
 
 

2013 South Korean television series debuts
2013 South Korean television series endings
Korean Broadcasting System television dramas
Korean-language television shows
South Korean thriller television series
South Korean melodrama television series
Television series by KeyEast